The South Para River is a river located in the Mount Lofty Ranges northeast of Adelaide in the Australian state of South Australia.

The river's name is based directly on the Kaurna word pari which means river. The "south" descriptor distinguishes it from the North Para River with which it merges.

Course and features
The South Para River rises in the Mount Lofty Ranges near Mount Crawford and Kersbrook and flows northwest through the Mount Lofty Ranges, passing through the Warren Reservoir and the South Para Reservoir, before reaching its confluence with the North Para River in Gawler to form the Gawler River. The South Para River descends  over its  course.

The South Para River catchment is one of the key watersheds in the northern Mount Lofty Ranges. It plays an important role in the functioning of South Australia, providing much of the water used by Adelaide's domestic supply in the Northern Adelaide area. Its waters are also used for livestock production, cereal cropping and recreation.

See also

 Hundred of Barossa
 Hundred of Para Wirra
 Hundred of Yatala

References

South Para River
Adelaide Hills